Roiate is a  (municipality) in the Metropolitan City of Rome in the Italian region of Lazio, located on the slope of Monte Scalambra on the hills between the Sacco and Aniene Rivers, about  east of Rome.

References

External links
 Official website

Cities and towns in Lazio